The  (also known as the Subaru XV until 2022) is a subcompact crossover SUV produced by Subaru since 2012. It is a successor to the Outback Sport in the US and Canada, and the Impreza XV globally. Like the Outback Sport, the Crosstrek is a lifted Impreza hatchback with minor differences, though with a more substantial lift than the Outback Sport.

Initially, the vehicle was marketed as the XV globally, and as the XV Crosstrek in the US and Canada. Since 2015, Subaru dropped the XV moniker in US and Canada. In 2022, Subaru introduced the third-generation model for a 2023 release under one nameplate globally, the Crosstrek.



First generation (GP; 2012)

Concept 
Subaru showcased the Subaru XV concept vehicle in 2011. Based on a raised suspension version of the Subaru Impreza 5-door hatchback, the XV concept offered aluminum alloy wheels with silver spokes, black wheels and clear blue center caps; yellow-green body colour, silvery white leather interior upholstery at seats, mesh in selected interior areas with yellow/green piping, multifunction display with navigation, car audio, and vehicle information in the center panel; EyeSight driving assist with stereo cameras and LCD monitor between the two combination meters, 2.0-liter four cylinder horizontally-opposed DOHC engine, Lineartronic CVT, and 245/45 ZR19 tires. The concept vehicle was unveiled at Auto Shanghai 2011.

Production version 

The production version of the XV was unveiled at the 2011 Frankfurt Motor Show. This model went on sale in Japan on 25 September 2012. It was introduced in the United States as the XV Crosstrek for the 2013 model year at the 2012 New York International Auto Show. It is powered by the FB20B engine making  (in the United States), sharing powertrain specifications with the Impreza. It included 17-inch wheels, as well as roof rails and tinted glass. All trims, along with all Subaru vehicles (excluding the BRZ), included Subaru's Symmetrical All-Wheel Drive system, with Lineartronic CVT equipped models being able to send 100% of torque to the wheels with the most traction. A 4.2 inch touchscreen and backup camera were included on the Limited trim, along with the all-weather package with heated seats. All trims had driver's auto up/down windows.

For the 2014 model year, a Hybrid version was released in the North American markets in two trims, the higher of which had new features with some of these being optional on the non-Hybrid Premium and Limited trims.For the 2015 model year, reversing cameras and 6.2 inch head units were added to all trims, as well as an upgraded electric power steering system. The Limited trim got an insulation-glass windshield, optional keyless ignition, an upgraded instrument cluster which included a color Liquid-Crystal Display. Upgraded mirrors with welcome lighting and turn signals were added as well. The then-new Starlink multimedia plus system with a 7.0 inch display that debuted on the 2015 Subaru Legacy and Outback was included as well. The Premium, Limited and Hybrid trims could be optioned with Subaru EyeSight and Hybrid models gained a PIN code access system. A special edition variant based on the premium trim with Sunrise Yellow paint was also available, but limited to 1,000 units.

For the 2016 model year, the Premium trim received the all weather package with heated seats and mirrors as standard equipment, along with the option of Subaru's Starlink Safety and Security system (standard on the Limited) including an SOS button, automatic collision notification system, stolen vehicle recovery, and a vehicle monitoring app. The Limited trim got rear cross-traffic alert, blind spot monitoring, and lane-change assist. This year also included revised styling and the removal of the XV prefix from the name in the United States and Canada. It was also the last year of the Hybrid model.

The 2017 model was largely unchanged, with the only change being a new trim, which was the Platinum Special Edition (which could be considered an option package to the Premium trim). Included was special interior and exterior styling, a sunroof, keyless ignition and entry, and blind-spot monitoring with rear cross-traffic alert.

Despite being a lifted Subaru Impreza hatchback, sales have been much stronger in the US, due to sedan/hatchback sales slowing in the country.

Other markets 
Malaysian production of the Subaru XV shipped as complete knock-down kits began at Tan Chong Motor Assemblies Sdn. Bhd (TCMA) in Malaysia in January 2013, with annual production of 5,000 units destined for sale in Malaysia, Thailand, Indonesia and the Philippines. Production at Tan Chong began on 20 December 2012.

Early European models include a choice of 1.6-liter petrol, 2.0-liter petrol, 2.0-liter diesel engines; five-speed manual (1.6-liter petrol), six-speed manual (2.0 petrol, 2.0 diesel), Lineartronic CVT (1.6 petrol, 2.0 petrol) transmission, and idle engine start stop (standard in petrol engine models, optional in diesel engine models).

In North America, the XV was sold as the Subaru XV Crosstrek and was unveiled at the 2012 New York International Auto Show. The US model went on sale in 2012 as a 2013 model year vehicle. Early models include a 148-horsepower 2.0-liter boxer engine, five-speed manual or available second-generation Lineartronic CVT. In the United States starting with the 2016 model year, Subaru dropped the XV from its name and sold it as simply the Crosstrek. An updated model based on the fifth-generation Impreza became available in 2018.

Hybrid version 

Externally, "HYBRID" badges have been applied to the front doors and on the rear liftgate, and unique rear lights and wheels are exclusive to the hybrid version. The vehicle was Subaru's first production hybrid after a series of concepts stretching back to the 2003 B9 Scrambler, and was unveiled at the 2013 New York International Auto Show. The 0.6 kW-hr battery (weighing  by itself) takes the space previously occupied by the spare tire, minimizing the loss of cargo space. The 10 kW generator-motor is built into the Lineartronic CVT, similar to the "turbo-parallel-hybrid" system first shown on the Subaru B5 TPH concept, and is intended to be used primarily for acceleration assistance and regenerative braking.

For the 2014 model year, the XV Crosstrek Hybrid was introduced in two trims, the XV Crosstrek Hybrid and Hybrid Touring. The Hybrid touring included a sunroof, leather, a navigation system with voice controls, Aha radio, HD radio, Satellite radio, and a 6.1 inch head unit. The Premium and Limited trims could be equipped with the upgraded head unit and a sunroof.

For 2015, Hybrid trims had their MPG increased to 30 city, 34 highway.

In 2016, after Subaru dropped the XV prefix from the model name in the United States and Canada, the model was known as the Crosstrek Hybrid. In Japan, a STI version of the XV Hybrid was offered with the suspension tuned to provide better handling. Externally, the XV Hybrid tS ("tuned by STI") can be distinguished by orange accents on the front spoiler, side skirts, and roof spoiler. It was sold for a limited time spanning the last half of 2016.

The model was discontinued after the 2016 model year.

Second generation (GT; 2017) 

The second-generation Subaru XV ("Crosstrek" for the North American market) was unveiled at the Geneva International Motor Show in March 2017. Like the Impreza, the XV/Crosstrek has moved to the Subaru Global Platform. During its first full month of sales, the XV sold 11,085 vehicles in Japan.

North America 

The base transmission was changed to a 6-speed manual transmission as opposed to the 5-speed in the first generation. The interior quality was upgraded, and a new 6.5-inch Subaru Starlink infotainment system with Apple CarPlay and Android Auto functionality was standard, with an 8.0 inch system and navigation being available on the Limited trim. While navigation was an option, all trims could use Apple Maps, Google Maps (via CarPlay and Android Auto respectively). Magellan Navigation is also available on all trims via the Starlink app, though the optional navigation is the only system that does not use the driver's smartphone to get map data, and is the only system that displays speed limits in the gauge cluster. Auto up/down windows were for the first time included for the passenger side (previously only on the driver's side). The Starlink Safety and Security system was made standard on the Premium trim. Models optioned with Eyesight got adaptive high beams. The Limited trim got adaptive LED headlights, keyless ignition and entry, an optional Harman Kardon was available and a 6-way power driver's seat was included. Subaru's X-MODE off-road assist function was also added.

For 2019, the Crosstrek received Eyesight on all models equipped with the CVT transmission. The Hybrid trim was reintroduced as a Plug-in Hybrid, based on the Toyota Prius Prime's Hybrid system.

For 2020, the Crosstrek received Subaru's SI-Drive powertrain management system, first available on the Subaru Forester and Subaru WRX models with a CVT. An auto start-stop system was added, along with an optional 6-way power driver's seat being added to the Premium trim. All models had USB and AUX ports moved from the center console to the console storage tray, which received lighting on the Premium and Limited trim. The Limited and Hybrid trims got rear seat USB ports. New is an automatic door locking and unlocking system with automatic unlocking in a collision. The Eyesight system now features lane centering.

Crosstrek Hybrid 
In May 2018, Subaru of America announced a plug-in hybrid electric version for the 2019 model year to serve as a compliance car, and thus is sold only in states that follow California emission standards. It has three different modes: full-electric (traction motor drawing from battery power), parallel hybrid (traction motor assisting gasoline engine), or series hybrid (motor-generator unit driven from gasoline engine).

XV e-BOXER 
Subaru introduced the e-BOXER hybrid powertrain for the European-market Forester and XV at Geneva in March 2019; the e-BOXER integrates an electric motor into the Lineartronic continuously-variable transmission to improve fuel economy and increase power. The battery for the traction motor is placed above the rear axle, improving the front/rear weight balance.

Facelift 

Starting summer of 2020, for the 2021 model year, Subaru began selling the Crosstrek with changes that include aesthetic tweaks, a new trim level, more driver assistance technology, and a new 2.5-liter engine option. The most obvious exterior styling change is larger front lower bumper cladding in black plastic. The new Sport trim level, above Premium and below the top spec Limited, will bring with it Subaru's dual X-Mode traction control with Snow/Dirt and Deep Snow/Mud terrain options. On the Canadian market, the Sport is known as the Outdoor. The Sport trim will also get a unique interior with a Sport logo plus yellow stitching. Limited trim vehicles will get a leather interior with orange stitching. For driver aids, any CVT-equipped Crosstrek can get adaptive cruise control and lane centering. Top-of-the-line Limited models will receive blind-spot detection with lane-change assist plus cross-traffic alert, reverse automated emergency braking, and high-beam assist. For the first time, the Crosstrek offers a 2.5-liter FB25D as an engine option, and it is only available with the CVT transmission on the Sport and Limited trim levels. The new engine offering makes , 30 more than the standard 2.0L engine.

For the 2023 model year, a new Special Edition package was introduced for the Premium trim, marking the return of the Desert Khaki color option offered in the previous generation. Also fitted with a custom black and red interior. With Red stitching and leather accents. As with the previous generation, the Special Edition was limited to 1,000 units. All Special Edition models were only available with the CVT transmission.

Third generation (GU; 2022) 

The third generation Crosstrek was revealed in Japan on September 15, 2022 while being based on the outgoing model. It went on sale in Japan in December 2022, being available with a cheaper front-wheel drive option.

North America 
The third generation Crosstrek for the North American market debuted at the Chicago Auto Show on February 9, 2023. The 2.0-liter FB20D and 2.5-liter FB25D engines are carried over from the previous generation, and the manual transmission has been discontinued. For the first time, the 2.5-liter Crosstrek Sport and Limited will be produced in the United States at Subaru of Indiana Automotive, Inc. in Lafayette, Indiana. The 2.0-liter Base and Premium trims will continue to be produced in Japan.

Southeast Asia 
The third generation Crosstrek debuted in Indonesia at Gaikindo Jakarta Auto Week on March 10, 2023.

Awards 
Motor Trend ranked the 2023 Subaru Crosstrek #1 Subcompact SUV.

Consumer Reports ranked the 2022 Subaru Crosstrek #1 Subcompact SUV.

U.S. News & World Report ranked the Subaru Crosstrek at No. 6 on its list of Best Subcompact SUVs for 2022, giving it a score of 7.9 out of 10.

Issues 

Many North American journalists and owners believe the Crosstrek is underpowered, like most cars in its class, and advocate for a turbocharged model, akin to the Subaru Impreza Gravel Express. This has partially been resolved with the MY2021 facelift since the Outdoor (Canada), Sport (US), and Limited trims now include a more powerful engine that brings its power closer to other compact crossover SUVs in the North American market and the competing Mazda CX-30 (non-turbocharged models).

MY2013–2018 Crosstreks with the CVT have had their transmission warranties extended to 10 years and 100,000 miles (and one year after their warranties were extended, that being 2018 for MY13-15 vehicles and 2019 for MY16-18 vehicles, regardless of age or mileage), with Subaru saying there were no complaints or conditions behind the extensions.

All MY2013 Crosstreks were given an extended engine warranty (8 years/100,000 miles, or one year from the warranty extension being published, regardless of age or mileage) due to excessive oil consumption after a class action lawsuit, with MY2014 and MY2015 models only being recalled with the manual transmission. All first generation Crosstreks were recalled for faulty brake light switches which Subaru stated was discovered themselves, with 33 reports on all affected models (including 2008–2016 Subaru Imprezas and 2014–2016 Subaru Foresters) in the US.

83,499 2018 Crosstreks and 37 2019 Crosstrek plug-In hybrids, along with 2017–2018 Subaru Imprezas and 2019 Subaru Forester and Ascent models were recalled for a faulty PCV valve that could break apart and cause oil consumption or possibly a stall.

In July 2021, a warranty extension for up to 10 years (and unlimited mileage) was applied to the electronic power steering rack of all 1st generation US Crosstreks (along with all 4th generation Foresters and Imprezas) due to the possibility of corrosion in areas with high amounts of road salt deployed in winter months (like the Rust Belt region of the United States) causing the rack to become prone to cracking after a significant impact. The issue doesn't cause complete failure of the rack, however it does cause issues with steering feel when turning. Owners who receive a repair will get an updated steering rack that is not prone to this issue.

In October 2021, a warranty extension for up to 8 years (and unlimited mileage) was applied to all first generation Crosstreks (along with most Subaru models of the time period) for the CVT parking brake switch, as when the contacts on the switch are contaminated, owners can't remove their key from their ignition switch. All affected vehicles, regardless or age or mileage, are covered by this extension until October 31, 2022.

Sales 
Sales in the United States have been much stronger than its predecessor, the Outback Sport, with 2019 being the first year with a sales drop, which could be attributed to a car sales slump in the US.

References

External links 

 Official website

Crosstek
Cars introduced in 2012
2020s cars
Mini sport utility vehicles
Crossover sport utility vehicles
All-wheel-drive vehicles
Front-wheel-drive vehicles
Cars powered by boxer engines
Vehicles with CVT transmission